Brusilovsky, Brussilovsky, Brusilovskiy  or Brusilovski (Ukrainian: Брусиловський, Russian: Брусиловский) is a Ukrainian masculine surname; its feminine counterpart is Brusilovskaya, Brussilovskaya or Brusilovska.  It is also an adjective derived from the closely related Russian surname Brusilov.
The origin of both surnames was traced to the verb  meaning mumble;. According to other sources  the immediate origin of surname Brusilovsky is the Ukrainian town Brusilov.

The surname may refer to

Alexandre Brussilovsky (born 1953), Soviet-born French violinist and conductor
Misha Brusilovsky (1931–2016), Russian painter and graphic artist 
Peter Brusilovsky, Soviet-born American computer scientist
Yevgeny Brusilovsky (1905–1981), Soviet and Russian composer

References

See also
 

Ukrainian-language surnames